Capsella is a genus of herbaceous plant and biennial plants in the family Brassicaceae. It is a close relative of Arabidopsis, Neslia, and Halimolobos.

Some authors circumscribe Capsella to contain only three species: Capsella bursa-pastoris, Capsella rubella and Capsella grandiflora. , Kew's Plants of the World Online list eight species.

Capsella rubella is a self-fertilizing species that became self-compatible 50,000 to 100,000 years ago.  Its outcrossing progenitor was Capsella grandiflora.  In general, the shift from outcrossing to self-fertilization is among the most common transitions in flowering plants.  Capsella rubella is studied as a model for understanding the evolution of self-fertilization.

The name is said to derive from Latin capsa, a box or case, alluding to fruit resembling a medieval wallet or purse; the suffix -ella denotes "lesser".

Species
Species include:
Capsella bursa-pastoris 
Capsella grandiflora 
Capsella lycia 
Capsella mexicana 
Capsella orientalis 
Capsella puberula 
Capsella rubella 
Capsella tasmanica

References

 
Brassicaceae genera